Vetle Skjærvik (born 15 September 2000) is a Norwegian footballer who plays as a defender for HamKam.

Career
Skjærvik played youth football at Roterud and Lillehammer, before starting his senior career with the latter in 2017. After three seasons with Lillehammer, he moved to HamKam in 2020. On 2 April 2022, he made his Eliteserien debut in a 2–2 draw against Lillestrøm.

References

External links

2000 births
Living people
Sportspeople from Lillehammer
Association football defenders
Norwegian footballers
Hamarkameratene players
Norwegian Fourth Division players
Norwegian Third Division players
Norwegian First Division players
Eliteserien players